Peter Mangels (14 June 1927 – 11 May 1991) was a Brazilian sailor. He competed in the Dragon event at the 1952 Summer Olympics.

References

External links
 

1927 births
1991 deaths
Brazilian male sailors (sport)
Olympic sailors of Brazil
Sailors at the 1952 Summer Olympics – Dragon
Place of birth missing